Nimbin is a triterpenoid isolated from Neem. Nimbin is thought to be responsible for much of the biological activities of neem oil, and is reported to have anti-inflammatory, antipyretic, fungicidal, antihistamine and antiseptic properties.

See also
 Azadirachtin, another chemical isolated from neem that is used commercially as an insecticide

References

Triterpenes
3-Furyl compounds
Acetate esters
Methyl esters
Cyclopentenes